Darius Khambrel Lewis (born 11 October 1999) is a professional footballer who plays as a winger for Botafogo B. Born in the United States, he has represented the Trinidad and Tobago national team.

Club career

Youth
Lewis spent time with teams in the Olympic Development Program in South Florida, and later six-month spells with USSDA side Boca Raton FC and FC Florida. In 2015, he made the move to Philadelphia Union's academy, where he played for three years.

Professional

Klaksvíkar Ítróttarfelag
Lewis opted to forgo playing college soccer and instead pursued a professional career. On January 8, 2019, he signed with Betri deildin menn side KÍ of the Faroe Islands. He helped the side win the league during his time there, scoring 3 goals in 12 league appearances.

FC Tucson
In September 2020, Lewis returned to the United States, joining USL League One side FC Tucson. He made his debut for the club on September 5, 2020, appearing as a 90th-minute substitute during a 2–2 draw with Richmond Kickers. His contract option was not picked up by Tucson following the 2020 season.

International career
Whilst born and raised in the United States, Lewis expressed a desire to represent Trinidad and Tobago, the country of birth of both of his parents.

He made his debut for the Trinidad & Tobago senior team on November 10, 2019, scoring two goals in a 15–0 victory over Anguilla, who were ranked bottom of the FIFA rankings.

International goals
Scores and results list Trinidad and Tobago's goal tally first.

Career statistics

Honors

Club
KÍ
 Faroe Islands Premier League: 2019

References 

1999 births
Living people
Association football forwards
Expatriate footballers in the Faroe Islands
FC Tucson players
People from Port St. Lucie, Florida
Soccer players from Florida
Citizens of Trinidad and Tobago through descent
Trinidad and Tobago footballers
Trinidad and Tobago expatriate footballers
Trinidad and Tobago international footballers
USL League One players
American sportspeople of Trinidad and Tobago descent